Curry Hammock State Park is a Florida State Park, located along both sides of US 1, starting at mile marker 56.2 on Crawl Key in the Florida Keys.

Activities
There are a multitude of activities available at Curry Hammock State Park. Kayaking, Fishing, Beach going are all there. You can also camp and bring your RV to the park to stay the night. Check in at the ranger station for more information.

Climate
Curry Hammock State Park has a tropical savanna climate (Aw).

Gallery

References

External links
Curry Hammock State Park at Florida State Parks

State parks of Florida
Parks in the Florida Keys
Protected areas established in 1991
Parks in Monroe County, Florida
1991 establishments in Florida